The 2021–22 ISU Speed Skating World Cup was a multi-race tournament over a season for speed skating. The season began on 12 November 2021 in Poland and ended on 13 March 2022 in Netherlands. The World Cup is organised by the ISU who also runs world cups and championships in short track speed skating and figure skating.

The World Cup consisted of five competitions this year.

The competitions (except the finals in Heerenveen) are qualifying event for the 2022 Olympic Winter Games in Beijing, China.

Calendar

Men

Tomaszów Mazowiecki 12–14 November 2021

Stavanger 19–21 November 2021

Salt Lake City 3–5 December 2021

Calgary 10–12 December 2021

Heerenveen 12–13 March 2022

Women

Tomaszów Mazowiecki 12–14 November 2021

Stavanger 19–21 November 2021

Salt Lake City 3–5 December 2021

Calgary 10–12 December 2021

Heerenveen 12–13 March 2022

World Cup standings

See also
 2023 World Single Distances Speed Skating Championships

Notes

References

External links 
 ISU.org World Cup Schedule
 Official results

ISU Speed Skating World Cup
Isu Speed Skating World Cup, 2021–22
Isu Speed Skating World Cup, 2021–22